Colonel Richard Stanley Hawks Moody,  (23 October 1854 – 10 March 1930) was a distinguished British Army officer, and historian, and Military Knight of Windsor. He was the eldest son of Major-General Richard Clement Moody, Kt. (who was the founder of British Columbia) and of Mary Susannah Hawks of the Hawks dynasty.

Birth and family
Hawks Moody was born in Strada Reale, Valletta, Malta on 23 October 1854. He was the eldest son of Major-General Richard Clement Moody, Kt. (who was the founder and the first Lieutenant-Governor of British Columbia) and of Mary Susannah Hawks. Mary Susannah Hawks was the daughter of the merchant banker Joseph Hawks JP DL, and of Mary Boyd of the Boyd merchant banking family. Hawks Moody's paternal grandfather was the geopolitician Colonel Thomas Moody, Kt.. Hawks Moody's uncle was Colonel Hampden Clement Blamire Moody CB, who was the Commander of the Royal Engineers in China during the Second Opium War and during the Taiping Rebellion.

Early life
Hawks Moody was born in Malta, when his father was Malta's Commanding Executive Officer of the Royal Engineers. Hawks Moody spent his infancy in the British Columbia, of which his father was founder and Lieutenant-Governor. Hawks Moody is regularly mentioned in the letters written by his mother, Mary Hawks, to England from colonies of the British Empire. Hawks Moody and his brothers were educated in England at Ludlow Grammar School and at Cheltenham College. Hawks Moody subsequently was commissioned, as a sub-lieutenant, in the 3rd Regiment of Foot, on 9 August 1873. He subsequently passed the Staff College, Camberley.

Military service

Anglo-Zulu War

Hawks Moody served in the Anglo-Zulu War, in 1879, as an adjutant, in Zululand, with the 2nd Battalion of the 3rd Regiment of Foot.

Malta
Hawks Moody was brigade major at Malta, 1885–90.

India and Pakistan

Between 1895 and 1897, Hawks Moody served in the Chitral Expedition, in which he was part of General William Forbes Gatacre's flying column.

Hawks Moody was part of the Malakand Field Force in 1897, during which he was second in command of 3rd Regiment of Foot under General Sir Bindon Blood, after whom he named his youngest daughter, Barbara Bindon. During this conflict, Hawks Moody was mentioned in dispatches, and fought alongside Winston Churchill, who mentions him in Chapter XII (At Inayat Kila) of his history of the conflict, The Story of the Malakand Field Force.

Second Boer War

Between 1899 and 1902, Hawks Moody served in the Second Boer War, for which he was mentioned in dispatches at least twice. He was promoted to lieutenant-colonel on 24 February 1900 to command a battalion of the Royal Munster Fusiliers, which was not raised, so he was sent to South Africa on special service, and commanded the 2nd battalion of the Royal Irish Fusiliers, from January 1901 to end of campaign. In this position he was again mentioned in despatches.  Following the end of the war in June 1902, he returned to England on the SS Custodian which landed at Southampton in August 1902. He was appointed a Companion of the Order of the Bath (CB) in the South Africa honours list, which was published on 26 June 1902, and he received both the Queen's and King's medals with 5 clasps. He received the decoration of CB from King Edward VII during an investiture at Buckingham Palace on 24 October 1902.

World War I

Hawks Moody initially retired from the Army in 1906, subsequent to which he was appointed Commander of the Devon and Somerset Brigade of the Territorial Army until 1910. Hawks Moody subsequent to the outbreak of World War I in 1914 rejoined active service and raised the 7th Battalion Royal Irish Fusiliers, of which he served as Colonel, in addition to as Colonel of 2nd Battalion Royal Irish Fusiliers and, in 1915, as Commandant of a School of Instruction for Officers at Dover. In 1916, he raised, from the Devonshire Regiment, and took to France, a battalion of the Labour Corps, which he commanded from 1917 to 1918, after which he retired again from service.

Military Knight of Windsor and Historian

Hawks Moody was appointed an honorary Colonel of the Buffs (East Kent Regiment) and a Military Knight of Windsor in 1919. He was a member of the Naval and Military Club. Hawks Moody, at the request of The Buffs, wrote The Historical Records of The Buffs (East Kent Regiment), 3rd Regiment of Foot, 1914–1919, which was published in 1923. He in 1922 gave the first copy of the book to the Royal Library, Windsor.

Hawks Moody lost his brother, Henry de Clervaulx Moody, in the Second Boer War, and his only son, Thomas Lewis Vyvian Moody, in the First World War. Hawks Moody died on 11 March 1930 at Windsor Castle. He is buried at All Saints' Churchyard in Monkland, Herefordshire, where there is at Plot 62 a memorial to him, and to his sister, Gertrude, and to his son, Thomas Lewis Vyvian Moody.

Marriage
Hawks Moody in 1887 married Mary Latimer (d. 1936), who was the daughter of John Latimer Esq. of Leeds.

Hawks Moody and Mary Latimer had four children:
 Mary Latimer (b. 1883, d. 1960). Married Major-General James Fitzgerald Martin at Exeter Cathedral, in 1906, and had one daughter, Mary Charlotte (b.1909).
 Margaret (b. 1886, d. unknown). Married Arthur Graham Brown, in 1914, and had two sons, George Arthur and Thomas Lionel Vyvian. Thomas Lionel Vyvian was educated at Cheltenham College and at Royal Military Academy, Woolwich, before he was commissioned in the Royal Engineers, with whom he went to Egypt with the 1st Armoured Division. He received the George Medal for service on the Agedabia El Aghelia Road on 17 January 1942.
 Thomas Lewis Vyvian (b. 4 November 1896, Peshawar, Bengal, d. 21 March 1918, killed in action, Lagnicourt, France). He was educated at Cheltenham College, at Eastbourne College, and at Royal Military Academy, Sandhurst. Subsequent to leaving Eastbourne College, Moody served on HMS Worcester, with the Royal Indian Marine Service, until the outbreak of the First World War in 1914, whereupon he entered the Australian Army at Melbourne. He served with the 8th battalion of the Royal Warwickshire Regiment during the Gallipoli Campaign. Subsequent to his wounding during the Gallipoli Campaign, Thomas Moody entered the Royal Military College, Sandhurst, from which he was commissioned, as Lieutenant, in the 1st battalion of Buffs (Royal East Kent Regiment), with which he served on the Western Front from July 1916. Thomas was fatally shot, whilst he was in command of platoons that were surrounded by German troops on the Western Front near Lagnicourt, by a German officer with a revolver. Thomas is commemorated at the Arras Memorial, France, and at The Royal Memorial Chapel, Chapel Square, Royal Military Academy Sandhurst. He died unmarried and without issue.
 Barbara Bindon (b. 1903, India, d. 1973). Barbara married the choral conductor James W. Webb-Jones on 20 December 1930, at Parish Church, Windsor, and had one daughter, Bridget (b. 5 September 1937) who married the musician Peter S. Lyons at Wells Cathedral in 1957.

Published works

References

Further reading

1854 births
1930 deaths
Burials in Herefordshire
Graduates of the Staff College, Camberley
Writers from Ludlow
Military personnel from Ludlow
People educated at Cheltenham College
Graduates of the Royal Military College, Sandhurst
British Army personnel of the Anglo-Zulu War
British military personnel of the Malakand Frontier War
British military personnel of the Chitral Expedition
British Army personnel of the Second Boer War
British Army personnel of World War I
Buffs (Royal East Kent Regiment) officers
Royal Irish Fusiliers officers
Royal Pioneer Corps officers
Companions of the Order of the Bath
Military Knights of Windsor
British military historians